Labuan International Business and Financial Centre (IBFC) is a special economic zone of the Malaysian government based on the island of Labuan off the Borneo coast.  It was established in 1990 and has been marketed as having a unique position to tap investment opportunities in Asia and beyond.

The Labuan IBFC shares a common time zone with many large Asian cities and its location between China and India as well as its proximity to several other financial centres has been used to promote the Labuan IBFC as a convenient location for business dealings.  Labuan has been designated as a financial centre and free trade zone by the Malaysian government.

History
In January 2008, a rebranding and repositioning exercise of the IBFC to reflect the jurisdiction's burgeoning international status was followed by an aggressive marketing exercise. This included the setting up of Labuan IBFC Incorporated Sdn. Bhd. in May of the same year with a mandate by the Malaysian government to market and promote Labuan as the premier International Business and Financial Centre in Asia Pacific.

References

External links 
 Labuan International Business And Financial Centre
 Labuan Financial Services Authority - Regulatory body for Labuan IBFC
 Bank Negara Malaysia - Central Bank Of Malaysia

Economy of Malaysia
Labuan
Special economic zones
Foreign trade of Malaysia
Ministry of Finance (Malaysia)